Tilt was a hamburger restaurant with multiple locations in Portland, Oregon, United States.

Description
Tilt's menu included burgers, sandwiches, house-made jalapeño tots, French fries, pies, and pie milkshakes. The  Island Trucker burger had a beef patty with honey-cured ham, beer-battered onion rings, grilled pineapple, Swiss cheese, and teriyaki. The business also served biscuits and gravy with bacon and pork. The last word cocktail had gin, Chartreuse, and maraschino liqueur, and the Second Amendment had rum, Aperol, lemon, cinnamon, and bitters. The Peanut Butter, Cookies and Cream, Pie Milkshake had a full slice of pie blended into the drink. The family-operated business' motto was "handcrafted food, built for the American workforce".

The business operated in three locations. Fodor's called the Pearl District restaurant a "slightly snazzier but still informal outpost of a classic blue-collar burger joint in Portland's industrial Swan Island neighborhood." The guide book says, "On the right side of this cavernous order-at-the-counter space, there's a full bar as well as a coffee counter serving high-quality Ristretto Roasters espresso drinks. There's ample seating on the patio, a former loading dock." Lonely Planet said the restaurant next to the Burnside Skatepark was "committedly industrial-chic" with "raw-concrete pillars [and] shop-rags for napkins".

History
Octavian and Brittany Jurj opened the original Tilt on Swan Island, in the Overlook neighborhood, in 2012.

In 2013, the restaurant announced plans to open a second location in the Pearl District. The restaurant opened in December.

The business announced plans for a third location in February 2014. Following a legal dispute and a year renovating the RJ Templeton Building, Tilt announced plans to instead open at the Yard, in the northeast Portland part of the Kerns neighborhood. The restaurant opened next to the Burnside Skatepark on August 13, 2018.

Tilt was featured on the fourth episode of the first season of the Food Network series The Grill Dads.

Reception 
Fodor's recommended the Island Trucker. In 2014, Chris Onstad of the Portland Mercury said Tilt was "hugely successful".

See also 

 List of defunct restaurants of the United States
 List of hamburger restaurants

References

External links

 
 Tilt (Pearl District) at Zomato

2012 establishments in Oregon
Defunct hamburger restaurants
Defunct restaurants in Portland, Oregon
Hamburger restaurants in the United States
Kerns, Portland, Oregon
Northeast Portland, Oregon
Overlook, Portland, Oregon
Pearl District, Portland, Oregon
Restaurants established in 2012